Dadhocha is a small village near Rawalpindi, Pakistan. Gakhars (Kayanis) are a majority clan but village also houses a large number from Rajput (Janjua) family. The area is semi mountainous and part of the Pothohar Plateau. The Dadhocha Dam is planned to be constructed in the area.

Dam 
Dadhocha Dam is a proposed dam which is to be built near Dadhocha village in Rawalpindi, Pakistan. The dam was initially proposed in 2001 but the construction has not yet been started. Estimated cost of the dam is 7 billion. The reservoir will provide 24 million gallons of water to Rawalpindi on a daily basis.

References 

Populated places in Rawalpindi District